Nomada crotchii is a species of nomad bee in the family Apidae. It is found in North America.

Subspecies
These two subspecies belong to the species Nomada crotchii:
 Nomada crotchii crotchii Cresson, 1878
 Nomada crotchii nigrior Cockerell, 1903

References

Further reading

 

Nomadinae
Articles created by Qbugbot
Insects described in 1878